Dublin Rathdown is a parliamentary constituency represented in Dáil Éireann, the lower house of the Irish parliament or Oireachtas, since the 2016 general election. The constituency elects three deputies (Teachtaí Dála, commonly known as TDs) on the system of proportional representation by means of the single transferable vote (PR-STV).

History and boundaries
It was established by the Electoral (Amendment) (Dáil Constituencies) Act 2013 and first used at the 2016 election. It largely replaced the old constituency of Dublin South, with the electoral divisions in Dún Laoghaire–Rathdown of Cabinteely-Loughlinstown, Foxrock-Carrickmines, Foxrock-Torquay and Stillorgan-Leopardstown being transferred to the Dún Laoghaire constituency; and the electoral divisions in South Dublin of Ballyboden, Edmondstown, Firhouse-Ballycullen, Firhouse-Knocklyon, Rathfarnham-Ballyroan, Rathfarnham-Butterfield, Rathfarnham-Hermitage, Rathfarnham-St. Enda's, Rathfarnham Village being transferred to the Dublin South-West constituency. There was a minor boundary revision at the 2020 general election.

TDs

Elections

2020 general election

2016 general election

See also
Elections in the Republic of Ireland
Politics of the Republic of Ireland
List of Dáil by-elections
List of political parties in the Republic of Ireland

References

External links
 Oireachtas Constituency Dashboards
 Oireachtas Members Database

Dáil constituencies
Parliamentary constituencies in County Dublin
Politics of Dún Laoghaire–Rathdown
2016 establishments in Ireland
Constituencies established in 2016